Franklin County is a county located in the U.S. state of Vermont. As of the 2020 census, the population was 49,946. Its county seat is the city of St. Albans. It borders the Canadian province of Quebec. The county was created in 1792 and organized in 1796. Franklin County is part of the Burlington metropolitan area.

History
Franklin County is one of several Vermont counties created from land claimed by Vermont on January 15, 1777, when Vermont declared itself to be a state distinct from New York. The land originally was contested by Massachusetts, New Hampshire, and New York, but it remained undelineated until July 20, 1764, when King George III established the boundary between New Hampshire and New York along the west bank of the Connecticut River, north of Massachusetts and south of the parallel of 45 degrees north latitude. New York assigned the land gained to Albany County. On March 12, 1772, Albany County was partitioned to create Charlotte County, and this situation remained until Vermont's independence from New York and Britain. However, this did not end the contest. In 1772, land surveyors John Collins of Quebec and Thomas Valentine of New York erected survey monuments along what they took to be the 45th parallel of north latitude, intended to be the boundary between New York and Quebec. The Webster–Ashburton Treaty of 1842 said that their measurement errors stand, so the boundary between Vermont and Quebec, and between New York and Quebec, is where Collins and Valentine put the survey monuments, some of which still stand today (see Collins–Valentine line).

On September 3, 1783, as a result of the signing of the Treaty of Paris the Revolutionary War ended with Great Britain recognizing the independence of the United States. Article II of the treaty agreed on boundaries between the United States and British possessions to the north, and included Vermont within the U.S. Vermont's border with Quebec was established at 45 degrees north latitude. In 1792, Franklin County was formed from part of Chittenden County. However, Vermont's government continued to take the position that it was independent of both the United States and Britain, and so it remained until 1791.

The county's namesake is Benjamin Franklin.

In 2008, the federal government declared the county a disaster area after severe storms and flooding on June 14–17.

Geography

Adjacent counties and municipalities
 Orleans County – east
 Lamoille County – southeast
 Chittenden County – southwest
 Grand Isle County – west
 Le Haut-Richelieu Regional County Municipality, Quebec – northwest
 Brome-Missisquoi Regional County Municipality, Quebec – north

National protected area
 Missisquoi National Wildlife Refuge

Demographics

2010 census
As of the 2010 United States Census, there were 47,746 people, 18,513 households, and 12,939 families residing in the county. Of the 18,513 households, 34.9% had children under the age of 18 living with them, 53.7% were married couples living together, 10.7% had a female householder with no husband present, 30.1% were non-families, and 22.7% of all households were made up of individuals. The average household size was 2.55 and the average family size was 2.97. The median age was 39.6 years.

The median income for a household in the county was $53,623 and the median income for a family was $63,009. Males had a median income of $43,155 versus $36,940 for females. The per capita income for the county was $24,767. About 7.2% of families and 10.5% of the population were below the poverty line, including 13.8% of those under age 18 and 8.7% of those age 65 or over.

Politics
In 1828, Franklin County was won by National Republican Party candidate John Quincy Adams

In 1832, the county was won by Anti-Masonic Party candidate William Wirt.

In 1836, the county was won by Democratic Party candidate Martin Van Buren

From William Henry Harrison in 1840 to Winfield Scott in 1852, the county would vote the Whig Party candidates.

From John C. Frémont in 1856 to Herbert Hoover in 1928 (barring 1912, where the county was won by Progressive Party candidate and former president Theodore Roosevelt), the Republican Party would have a 72-year winning streak in the county.

In 1932, the county was won by Democratic candidate Franklin D. Roosevelt and would be won by him in all four of his presidential runs from 1932 to 1944. During that time, Franklin County, along with Chittenden and Grand Isle Counties would become Democratic enclaves in an otherwise Republican-voting Vermont. The county would also be won by Harry S. Truman in 1948.

Dwight D. Eisenhower was able to win back Franklin County for the Republicans during the 1952 and 1956 elections.

The county would go to Democratic candidates John F. Kennedy in 1960, Lyndon B. Johnson in 1964, and Hubert H. Humphrey in 1968.

Incumbent President Richard Nixon would carry the county in 1972 as would Gerald Ford in 1976.

In 1980 and 1984, the county was won by Republican Ronald Reagan, who would become the last Republican presidential candidate to win Franklin County.

Since Michael Dukakis won the county in 1988, it has been won by Democratic candidates ever since.

|}

Economy

Personal income
The median income for a household in the county was $41,659, and the median income for a family was $46,733. Males had a median income of $32,009 versus $24,078 for females. The per capita income for the county was $17,816.  About 7.00% of families and 9.00% of the population were below the poverty line, including 10.40% of those under age 18 and 10.30% of those age 65 or over.

Industry
In 2009, the county had the most dairy farms in the state, 239 out of 1,078.

Communities

City
 St. Albans (city)

Towns

 Bakersfield
 Berkshire
 Enosburgh
 Fairfax
 Fairfield
 Fletcher
 Franklin
 Georgia
 Highgate
 Montgomery
 Richford
 Sheldon
 St. Albans (town)
 Swanton

Villages
Villages are census divisions, but have no separate corporate existence from the towns they are in.
 Enosburg Falls – village of Enosburgh
 Swanton Village – village of Swanton

Census-designated places
 Bakersfield
 Fairfax
 Highgate Center
 Highgate Springs
 Richford

See also
 National Register of Historic Places listings in Franklin County, Vermont
 Chester Alan Arthur State Historic Site birthplace of President Chester Arthur.

References

External links

 Franklin County Regional Chamber of Commerce
 The Franklin County Sheriff's Office
 Vermont Judiciary: Franklin Civil Division
 National Register of Historic Places listing for Franklin Co., Vermont

 
1796 establishments in Vermont
Burlington, Vermont metropolitan area
Populated places established in 1796